Vigneault is a  surname most commonly found in Quebec, Canada, and may refer to one of the following people:

Alain Vigneault (born 1961), Canadian ice hockey coach
David Vigneault (appointed 2017), Director of the Canadian Security Intelligence Service 
Gilles Vigneault (born 1928), Canadian poet and Quebec nationalist
Guillaume Vigneault (born 1970), Canadian novelist and son of Gilles Vigneault
Michel Vigneault (sailor) (born 1967), Canadian naval officer
Sonia Vigneault, Canadian actress